A list of types of disorders.

A
Adenoid disorders
Adrenal disorders 
Allergic disorders 
Anorectic disorders 
Antisocial personality disorder
Anxiety disorders 
Appendix disorders 
Articulation disorders
Attention deficit disorder
Autonomic nerve disorders
Acute stress disorder
Adjustment disorder
Agoraphobia
Autism disorder

B

Balance disorder 
Behavioral disorders
Bleeding disorders
Bipolar disorders
Body dysmorphic disorder
Borderline personality disorder

C
Cartilage disorders
Cephalic disorders
Chromosomal disorders
Clotting disorders
Communication disorders
Congenital disorders
Congenital insensitivity to pain with anhidrosis
Conjunctival disorders
Connective tissue disorders
Cornea disorders

D
Delusional disorders
Depressive disorders
Disc disorders
Dissociative disorders
Digestive disorders
Dyslexia

F
Female genital disorders
Fluency disorders
Fetal Alcohol Spectrum Disorder
Fetal Drug Spectrum Disorder
Fetal Tobacco Spectrum Disorder

H
Hearing disorders
Heritable disorders of connective tissue

I
Iatrogenic disorders
Immune disorders
Impulse control disorders

L
Language disorders
Learning disorders
Lens disorders

M
Manical disorders
Metabolic disorders
Mood disorders
Multiple personality disorder
Movement disorders

N
Narcissistic personality disorder
Nervous system disorders
Neuronal migration disorders
Neurological disorder

O
Orthopedic disorders 
Obsessive–compulsive disorder

P
Peritoneum disorders
Personality disorders
Pervasive developmental disorders
Post-traumatic stress disorders
Psychiatric disorders, i.e., mental illness
Psychoactive substance abuse disorders
Psychological disorders, i.e., mental illness
Psychotic disorders
Puerperal disorders

R
Refractive eye disorders
Repetitive motion disorders
Rett Syndrome

S
Sexual dysfunction
Sleep disorders
Social anxiety disorder
Soft tissue disorders
Somatoform disorders
Spastic disorders
Speech disorders
Spinal cord disorders
Strabismus
Systemic disorders
Schizoaffective disorders

T
Testicle disorders
Thymus disorders
Thyroid disorders
Tonsil disorders
Translocation chromosome disorders
Triplet repeat genetic disorders
Tourette disorders
TMJ disorders
Trichotillomania

V
Vein disorders
Voice disorders

X
X chromosome disorders

Y
Y chromosome disorders

See also
 List of diseases

Disorders
Disorders